Volshnitsy is a rural locality (a village) in Novlenskoye Rural Settlement, Vologodsky District, Vologda Oblast, Russia. The population was 16 as of 2002.

Geography 
Volshnitsy is located 68 km northwest of Vologda (the district's administrative centre) by road. Panovo is the nearest rural locality.

References 

Rural localities in Vologodsky District